The 2001 Omaha mayoral election was held on May 15, 2001. It saw the election of Mike Fahey, who unseated incumbent mayor Hal Daub.

Election results

General

References

Omaha
2001 Nebraska elections
2005